Stjärnorna på slottet (English: Stars at the Castle) is a Swedish show featuring five film or music stars which is usually broadcast during the Christmas and New Year Eve weekend and a bit into January each year. The show was broadcast for the first time in January 2006 on SVT. The show has received a lot of attention in media and has had high ratings. The show has been filmed at several castles over the years, including Trolleholm Castle in Scania (2005 and 2007), Häckeberga Castle in Scania (2008), Thorskog House in Bohuslän (2009 and 2010), Görväln House in Uppland (2011), Bäckaskog Castle in Scania (2012–2013), Bjärsjölagård Castle in Scania (2014) and Ericsberg Castle in Södermanland (2015).

The show basis is that five famous people live together in a castle for five days. Each person has one day that focuses on them and their career, they eat dinners where they discuss the individual. In 2008 the show won "Entertainment show of the year" at Kristallen.

Seasons

Season 1 
Recorded at Trolleholm Castle in Scania in the late summer of 2005.
 Maud Adams
 Börje Ahlstedt
 Peter Harryson
 Mona Malm
 Sven-Bertil Taube

Season 2 
Recorded at Trolleholm Castle in the late summer of 2007.
 Britt Ekland
 Magnus Härenstam
 Jan Malmsjö
 Arja Saijonmaa
 Peter Stormare

Season 3 
Recorded at Häckeberga Castle in Scania, 3–9 August 2008.
 Janne "Loffe" Carlsson
 Kjerstin Dellert
 Jonas Gardell
 Staffan Scheja
 Christina Schollin

Season 4 
Recorded at Thorskog House in Bohuslän, 23–29 July 2009.
 Kjell Bergqvist
 Tommy Körberg
 Siw Malmkvist
 Björn Ranelid
 Meg Westergren

Season 5 
Recorded at Thorskog House, 8–13 July 2010.
 Ulf Brunnberg
 Monica Dominique
 Dan Ekborg
 Marie Göranzon
 Niklas Strömstedt

Season 6 
Recorded at Görväln House in Uppland in August 2011. Louise Hoffsten replaced Maria Lundqvist who could not attend.
 Kim Anderzon
 Louise Hoffsten
 Christer Lindarw
 Johan Rabaeus
 Johan Rheborg

Season 7 
Recorded at Bäckaskog Castle in Scania in the summer of 2012.
 Ewa Fröling
 Robert Gustafsson
 Claes Malmberg
 Barbro "Lill-Babs" Svensson
 Philip Zandén

Season 8 
Recorded at Bäckaskog Castle in the Summer of 2013.
 Leif Andrée
 Malena Ernman
 Maria Lundqvist
 Claes Månsson
 Lasse Åberg

Season 9
Recorded at Bjärsjölagård Castle in Scania in the Summer of 2014.
 Harriet Andersson
 Helena Bergström
 Özz Nûjen
 Örjan Ramberg
 Rikard Wolff

Season 10
Recorded at Ericsberg Castle in Södermanland in the Summer of 2015. This is the first season that three women and two men will participate instead of the opposite like in earlier seasons.
 Marika Lagercrantz
 Morgan Alling
 Claire Wikholm
 Stefan Sauk
 Amanda Ooms

Season 11
Took place at Ericsbergs castle in Södermanland in Katrineholm during the summer of 2016.

 Magnus Uggla
 Lia Boysen
 Gunnel Fred
 Johannes Brost
 Sofia Ledarp

Season 12
Took place at Teleborg Castle in Växjö in August 2017.

 Peter Jöback
 Ann-Louise Hanson
 Bosse Parnevik
 Marianne Mörck
 Regina Lund

References 

2006 Swedish television series debuts
Sveriges Television original programming
Swedish reality television series
Swedish-language television shows